Çevreli is a village in the Adaklı District, Bingöl Province, Turkey. The village is populated by Kurds of the Şadiyan tribe and had a population of 156 in 2021.

The hamlets of Baluco, Çörekçi, Fiseyür, Korkmaz, Tirşo, Uzunpazar and Yoncalık are attached to the village.

References 

Villages in Adaklı District
Kurdish settlements in Bingöl Province